This is a list of libraries in Albania.

National libraries
 National Library of Albania
 Library of the National Archaeological Museum
 Parliament of Albania Library

Public libraries
 Marin Barleti Public Library

University libraries
 Library of the Academy of Sciences of Albania
 Library of the Natural Sciences Faculty
 Library J. Limprecht of the Economy Faculty
 Library of the History and Philology Faculty
 Library of the Justice Faculty
 Library of the Social Sciences Faculty
 Library of the Agriculture University of Tirana
 Library of the Sports University
 Academy of Arts Library
 Library of the Medicine Faculty
 Scientific Library of the Polytechnic University
 Library of the Civil Engineering Faculty
 Luigj Gurakuqi University Library

See also
 List of schools in Albania
 List of universities in Albania

References

 
Albania
Libraries
Libraries